Rajshahi Science & Technology University or RSTU is a private university in Natore, Bangladesh. It was established in 2013.

Faculties and departments
The university has the following faculties and departments:

Faculty of Science and Engineering
 Department of Computer Science and Engineering
Bachelor of Science in Computer Science and Engineering (CSE)
Bachelor of Science in Computer Science and Engineering (CSE)-For Diploma
  Department of Electrical & Electronics Engineering
Bachelor of Science in Electrical & Electronics Engineering (EEE)
Bachelor of Science in Electrical & Electronics Engineering (EEE)-For Diploma
 Department of Civil Engineering
Bachelor of Science in Civil Engineering (CE)
Bachelor of Science in Civil Engineering (CE)-For Diploma
 Department of Textile Engineering
Bachelor of Science in Textile Engineering (TE)
Bachelor of Science in Textile Engineering (TE)-For Diploma
 Department of Science
Bachelor of Pharmacy [B.Pharm(Hons.)]

Faculty of Business
 School of Business
Bachelor of Business Administration (BBA)
Master of Business Administration (MBA) (Regular)
Master of Business Administration (Executive)

Faculty of liberal arts and social sciences
School of liberal arts and social sciences'
Bachelor of Laws (LLB) (2 Yrs.)
Bachelor of Laws with Honours (LLB-Hons.)
Master of Laws (LLM)
Bachelor of Arts in English (Hons.)
Master of Arts in English
BSS in Economics (Hons.)
BSS in media and journalism
BSS in Sociology (Hons.)

Newly constructed Academic Building of Rajshahi Science & Technology University at VIP Tower, Holding # 112 Dhaka Road, Bara Harishpur, Natore Sadar Natore 6400.

List of vice-chancellors 

 Mohammed Shahjahan (present)

Accreditation
The academic programs of the university are recognized by the following organizations:
 UGC University Grants Commission Bangladesh

Notable alumni and faculty members 

 Banaj Kumar Majumder, Chief, Police Bureau of Investigation.

References

External links
 

Private universities in Bangladesh
Private engineering universities of Bangladesh
Universities of science and technology in Bangladesh
2013 establishments in Bangladesh
Educational institutions established in 2013